This is a list of notable White Africans of European ancestry, including both European immigrants who obtained citizenship in an African country and their descendants.

List

Algeria 

Daniel Auteuil, actor
Albert Camus, writer
Pierre Chaulet, physician
Mickaël Fabre, footballer
Nicole Garcia, actor
Danièle Minne, activist
Emmanuel Roblès, writer
Yves Saint Laurent, fashion designer
Jean Sénac, poet

Angola 

Carlos Alberto Fernandes, footballer
Hugo Ferreira, rock musician
Paulo Figueiredo, footballer
Pepetela, novelist
João Ricardo, footballer
Pedro Emanuel, footballer
Madjer, beach soccer player
Michelle Larcher de Brito, tennis player
Ricardo Teixeira, racing driver
Madilyn Bailey, singer
Paulo Madeira, footballer
José Águas, footballer
Rúben Gouveia, footballer
Luaty Beirão, rapper and activist

Botswana

Roy Blackbeard, diplomat
Christian de Graaff, politician
James Freeman, swimmer
Ruth Williams Khama, former first lady
Derek Jones, politician
 Ian Kirby, attorney general
John Mackenzie (1835–99), missionary to and advocate for the Tswana people, first governor of British Bechuanaland
Samantha Paxinos, swimmer
Hendrik van Zyl (1828–80), notorious trader from Ghanzi who allegedly hid a vast treasure in the cave systems nearby
Brandon Wilson, football player

Cape Verde
 Jorge Carlos Fonseca, President of Cape Verde
 Carlos Lisboa, basketball coach

Cameroon
 Claire Denis, writer
 Michel Gordillo, aviator

Equatorial Guinea
Nené Ballina, former football player and coach
Alvaro Cervera, former football player and coach

Eritrea
Marina Colasanti, writer
Erminia Dell'Oro, writer
Bruno Lauzi, singer
Gianfranco Rosi, documentary filmmaker
Lara Saint Paul, singer
Italo Vassallo, footballer
Luciano Vassallo, footballer 
Luciano Violante, politician and judge

Gabon
 Lee White, conservationist, Minister of Water, Forests, the Sea, and Environment
 Marcel Lefebvre, bishop
 Sarah Myriam Mazouz, judoka
 Sylvia Bongo Ondimba, first lady

Ghana
 Joyce Bamford-Addo, speaker of the Parliament of Ghana
 William Boyd, writer
 John Collins, musician

Ivory Coast

 Constance Amiot, writer, composer
 Dominique Ouattara, first lady
 Katell Quillévéré, director

Kenya

Michael Bear, Lord Mayor of London
Arap Bethke, actor 
Michael Blundell, farmer, politician
Roger Chapman, golfer
Jamie Dalrymple, cricketer
Richard Dawkins, evolutionist
Ian Duncan, rally driver
Jason Dunford, swimmer
David Dunford, swimmer
Chris Froome, cyclist
Peter Hain, Labour Party politician
Louis Leakey, archaeologist
Richard Leakey, paleoanthropologist
Bruce Mackenzie, politician
Beryl Markham, aviator
Eva Monley, film producer
Derek Pringle, cricketer
John Spurling, author
Carl Tundo, rally driver
Haydn Bauer, Conservationist

Malawi
 Patrick Allen, actor
 Tony Bird, singer-songwriter
 Bronte Campbell, Australian swimmer
 Cate Campbell, Australian swimmer
 Lucinda Fredericks, equestrian athlete
 Kit Hesketh-Harvey, musical performer, translator, composer, screenwriter
 Richard Liversidge, naturalist
 Malcolm Ross, guitarist
 James John Skinner, chief justice
 Jan-Jaap Sonke, politician
 Anthea Stewart, field hockey player

Morocco

Bibiana Fernandez, actress
Just Fontaine, footballer
Roberto Lopez Ufarte, footballer
Olivier Martinez, actor
Jean Reno, actor
Richard Virenque, cyclist

Mozambique

Jorge Cadete, former footballer
Ricardo Campos, footballer
Carlos Cardoso, journalist
Mia Couto, writer
Roger De Sá, football manager
Ruy Guerra, director and screenwriter
Teresa Heinz, philanthropist
Jojó, footballer
Carlos Queiroz, football coach
Otelo Saraiva de Carvalho, military officer
Tasha de Vasconcelos, model
Carlos Xavier, former footballer
Al Bowlly, crooner
Amanda DaCosta, football player
Paulo Fonseca, football coach

Namibia

Jacques Burger, rugby player 
Dan Craven, cyclist
Tristan de Lange, cyclist
Maike Diekmann, rower
Trevor Dodds, golfer
Till Drobisch, cyclist
Erik Hoffmann, cyclist
Adolph Jentsch, artist
Vera Looser, cyclist
Gert Lotter, cricketer and rugby player
Michelle McLean, Miss Universe 1992
Percy Montgomery, rugby player
Dirk Mudge, politician
De-Wet Nagel, musician
Du Preez Grobler, rugby player
Oliver Risser, footballer
Manfred Starke, footballer
Johannes van der Merwe, cricketer
Raimar von Hase, farmer
Anoeschka von Meck, writer
Arend von Stryk, footballer
Piet van der Walt, deputy minister
Behati Prinsloo, model

Nigeria

Christina Dodwell, adventurer
Caroline Hawley, journalist
Fiona Fullerton, actress
John Godwin and Gillian Hopwood, architects
Kevin McDaid, photographer
Cait O'Riordan, musician
James Reyne, musician
Edward Stourton, journalist
Sussan Ley, politician
Leo Hale Taylor, priest
Hugo Weaving, actor
Jeremy Joyner White, educationist

Senegal

Jean-Pierre Bourhis, canoeist
Jeanne Boutbien, swimmer
Marcel-François Lefebvre, archbishop
Marc Lièvremont, rugby player
Ségolène Royal, French politician
Viviane Wade, first lady

Seychelles

Jean-Paul Adam, Minister of Health and Social Affairs
James Mancham, first president (1976-1977)
France-Albert René, second president (1977-2004)
Gérard Hoarau, opposition leader
Maurice Loustau-Lalanne, former Minister for Tourism

South Africa
Brent Cunningham, Cyclist
Raymond Ackerman, businessman
Ken Andrew, politician
Greg Albertyn, World and US Motocross Champion
John-Lee Augustyn, cyclist
Hugh Baiocchi, golfer
Christiaan Barnard, heart surgeon
David Bateson, actor
Wendy Beckett, religious sister
Mike Bernardo, kickboxer
Brad Binder, MotoGP rider
Matthew Booth, footballer
Ricardo Nunes
Jacobus Boshoff, voortrekker
Francois Botha, professional boxer
Louis Botha, politician
P. W. Botha, former state president
Pik Botha, diplomat
Sandra Botha, Democratic Alliance leader
Leon Botha, rapper and painter
Sydney Brenner, biologist
Breyten Breytenbach, anti-apartheid activist
Jan Breytenbach, soldier
Bles Bridges, singer
André Brink, writer
Schalk Burger, rugby player
Zola Budd, track athlete
Rory Byrne, Formula One designer
Kitch Christie, onetime Springboks coach
Sarel Cilliers, voortrekker
Tim Clark, golfer
Gerrie Coetzee, boxer
J. M. Coetzee, novelist
Hansie Cronje, cricketer
Robyn Curnow, CNN International's anchor of International Desk
Kevin Curren, tennis player
Ian Davidson, politician
Racheltjie de Beer, Afrikaner heroine
Christiaan Rudolf de Wet, Boer commander
F. W. de Klerk, former state president; worked towards ending apartheid
Koos de la Rey, Boer commander
Casper de Vries, entertainer
Natalie du Toit, swimmer
Anri du Toit, actress and rapper
Os du Randt, rugby player
Sean Dundee, footballer
Giniel De Villiers, rally raid champion
Cromwell Everson, composer
Schalk Ferreira, rugby player
Wayne Ferreira, tennis player
Darren Fichardt, golfer
Bram Fischer, lawyer
Mark Fish, footballer
Mary Anne Fitzgerald, writer and journalist resident in Kenya
Johnny Flynn, actor
Bruce Fordyce, marathon athlete
Jaque Fourie, rugby player
Mark González, footballer
Anton Goosen, musician
Retief Goosen, golfer
Nadine Gordimer, writer
 Sir Nigel Hawthorne, actor
J. B. M. Hertzog, politician
Penelope Heyns, swimmer
Steve Hofmeyr, singer
Butch James, rugby player
Craig Johnston, footballer
Piet Joubert, Boer commander
Jacques Kallis, cricketer
Olaf Kölzig, NHL hockey player
Johan Kriek, tennis player
Antjie Krog, writer
Paul Kruger, politician
Gé Korsten, singer
Brett Kebble, businessman
Alice Krige, actress
Cornelis Jacobus Langenhoven, author of South African national anthem
Chad le Clos, swimmer
Tony Leon, politician
Paul Lloyd, Jr, wrestler
Bobby Locke, former golfer
Adolph "Sailor" Malan, World War II Flying ace
Daniel François Malan, former prime minister
Dawid Malan, cricket player
Magnus Malan, soldier
Jeremy Mansfield, radio personality
Eugene Marais, poet 
Victor Matfield, rugby player
Dave Matthews, musician
Elana Meyer, runner
Shaun Morgan, musician
Pieter Mulder, politician
Elon Musk, business magnate
Steve Nash, basketball player
Ryk Neethling, swimmer
Harry Oppenheimer, businessman
Nicky Oppenheimer, businessman
Alan Paton, novelist
Francois Pienaar, rugby player
Sasha Pieterse, actress
Kevin Pietersen, cricketer
Oscar Pistorius, athlete 
Gary Player, golfer
Graeme Pollock, cricketer
Andries Hendrik Potgieter, voortrekker
Andries Pretorius, voortrekker, Pretoria founder
Piet Retief, voortrekker
Cecil Rhodes, Cape imperialist
Justin Rose, golfer
Anton Rupert, businessman
Johann Rupert, businessman
Jody Scheckter, Formula One driver
Leon Schuster, comedian
Harry Schwarz, lawyer
Mark Shuttleworth, space tourist
Troye Sivan, web star
Frederik van Zyl Slabbert, politician
Joe Slovo, South African Communist Party leader
Jan Smuts, former prime minister
Andre Stander, career criminal
Martinus Theunis Steyn, politician
Johannes Gerhardus Strijdom, former prime minister
Helen Suzman, politician
Janet Suzman, actress (niece of Helen Suzman)
Basil Rathbone, actor
Candice Swanepoel, model
Charles Robberts Swart, politician
Roland Schoeman, swimmer
Michael Tellinger, scientist, author, leader of Ubuntu Party
Eugène Terre'Blanche, Afrikaner Weerstandsbeweging leader
ZP Theart, singer, vocalist of DragonForce
Charlize Theron, actress
J.R.R. Tolkien, writer
Shaun Tomson, surfer
Piet Uys, voortrekker
Pieter-Dirk Uys, comedian
Bok van Blerk, singer
Irene van Dyk, netball champion
Siener van Rensburg, Boer prophet
Marthinus van Schalkwyk, politician
Joost van der Westhuizen, rugby player
Minki van der Westhuizen, model
Hendrik Frensch Verwoerd, former prime minister
Daniel Vickerman, rugby player
Constand Viljoen, soldier
Hans Vonk, footballer
B. J. Vorster, former prime minister
Arnold Vosloo, actor
Jake White, rugby coach
Watkin Tudor Jones, actor and rapper
Helen Zille, Premier of the Western Cape
Cliff Drysdale, tennis player and announcer
 Andrew Surman

Swaziland

Richard E. Grant, actor
Keith Fraser, skier
Luke Hall, swimmer
Nathan Kirsh, businessman
Wickus Nienaber, swimmer
Franc O'Shea, musician
Robinson Stewart, athlete
Robyn Young, swimmer

Tanzania

Hilde Frafjord Johnson, Norwegian politician
Alan Johnston, journalist
Ricky Bartlett, actor and radio host
Jane Goodall, British primatologist and anthropologist
Jon Haylett, novelist
Nico Ladenis, chef
Sara Larsson, singer
Hugo van Lawick, Dutch wildlife filmmaker and photographer
Tim Macartney-Snape, mountaineer
Michael Riegels, lawyer
Alex Rontos, political adviser
Raimund Schelcher, actor
Werner Schuster, physician
Naomi Wilson, Australian politician
Kai-Uwe von Hassel, German politician

Uganda
Bob Astles, soldier and colonial officer
Denis Parsons Burkitt, surgeon
Sir Albert Cook, doctor
Katherine Cook, doctor
Ian Clarke, missionary, physician, Mayor of Makindye Division, Kampala
Richard Gibson, actor
Danny Keogh, actor
Louise Pirouet, teacher
Marcel Theroux, novelist

Zambia

Greg Aplin, Australian politician
Wallie Babb, hurdle athlete
Tina Beattie, theologian
Craig Brown , canoeist
Stewart Gore-Browne, soldier, politician
Angus Buchan, evangelist
Cecil Dennistoun Burney, businessman
Jean Jacques Corbeil, missionary
Norman Carr, conservationist
Dan Crawford, missionary
Joseph Dupont, bishop
Phil Edmonds, cricketer
John Edmond, singer
Gabriel Ellison, co-designer of Zambian national flag
David Fairbairn, painter
Stanley Fischer, economist
Ralph Goveia, swimmer
Tawny Gray, sculptor
A. C. Grayling, philosopher
Trevor Haynes, runner
Dafydd James, rugby player
V. M. Jones, author
Corné Krige, rugby player
David Livingstone, physician, missionary
Robert John "Mutt" Lange, music producer
Edna Maskell, hurdle athlete
Tilka Paljk, swimmer
Daran Ponter, New Zealand politician 
Lindsay Reeler, cricketer
Alan Rusbridger, journalist
Charlotte Harland Scott, first lady
Guy Scott, president
Jeffery Smith, sprinter
Peter Stimpson, cricketer
Guus Til, football player 
Stevie Vann, singer

Zimbabwe

Miles Anderson, actor
Roy Bennett, politician
Macauley Bonne, footballer
Byron Black, tennis player
Cara Black, tennis player
Don Black, tennis player
Wayne Black, tennis player
Erich Bloch, economist
John Bredenkamp, businessman
Catherine Buckle, writer
Ryan Cairns, golfer
Mike Campbell, farmer
Marc Cayeux, golfer
Maggie Chapman, Scottish politician and lecturer
Liz Chase, field hockey player
David Coltart, politician
Rick Cosnett, actor
Kirsty Coventry, swimmer
Christopher Cowdray, hotel manager
Sean Crocker, golfer
Eddie Cross, politician
David Curtis, rugby player
Chelsy Davy, onetime girlfriend of Prince Harry
Lucia Evans, singer
Brendon de Jonge, golfer
Clifford Dupont, former Rhodesian president
Andy Flower, cricketer
Humphrey Gibbs, politician
Peter Godwin, writer
Bruce Grobbelaar, footballer
Ernest Guest, politician
Vangelis Haritatos, politician
Ken Harnden, track and field coach 
Graeme Hick, cricketer
Heidi Holland, journalist
Nicholas van Hoogstraten, businessman and real estate magnate
John Houghton, politician
Richard Hope Hall, politician
Graham Johnson, musician
Timothy Jones, cyclist
Iain Kay, farmer and politician
Jock Kay, farmer and politician
Bruce Keogh, surgeon
Sam Levy, businessman and property developer
Tony Johnstone, golfer
Nigel Lamb, aviator
Doris Lessing, novelist
Rusty Markham, politician
Mark McNulty, golfer
Thomas Meikle, businessman
Sebastian Negri, rugby player
Denis Norman, farmer and minister
Andrew Peebles, rower
Nick Price, golfer
Peter Purcell-Gilpin, rower
Billy Rautenbach, businessman
Conrad Rautenbach, rally driver
Ronald Reid-Daly, soldier; leader of the Selous Scouts
John Robinson, footballer
Glen Salmon, footballer
Alexander McCall Smith, writer
Ian Smith, former Rhodesian prime minister
Timothy Stamps, politician
Trudy Stevenson, politician
Gavin Sutherland, archer
Wrex Tarr, entertainer
Clem Tholet, singer
Micheen Thornycroft, rower
Garfield Todd, former Rhodesian prime minister
Kevin Ullyett, tennis player
Mark Vermeulen, cricketer
Scott Vincent, golfer
Peter Walls, soldier
General Michael Dawson Walker, British soldier
Nicola Watson, politician
Roy Welensky, former Rhodesia and Nyasaland prime minister
Peter Wetzlar, swimmer
Guy Whittall, cricketer

Others

Adeline André, Ubangi-Shari-born fashion designer
Steve Barker, Lesotho-born former footballer
Paul Bérenger, former prime minister of Mauritius
Claudia Cardinale, Tunisian actress
Claudio Gentile, Italian Libya-born footballer
Gabriella Ghermandi, Ethiopia-born writer and singer
Gerardo Miranda, French West Africa-born footballer 
Mário Palma, Guinea-Bissau-born basketball coach

See also
Afrikaners
British diaspora in Africa
White Africans of European ancestry

 
 
European ancestry
European